Aigon (Aighon) is an Austronesian language spoken by about 2000 individuals between the Avio and Amgen rivers in West New Britain Province, Papua New Guinea on the island of New Britain.

References

External links 
 Open access archived recordings are available in Kaipuleohone of a word list as well as a recording of a conversation between Bebeli speakers and Aighon speakers.

Pasismanua languages
Languages of West New Britain Province